Hussainabad is a small village in Hunza, Pakistan. There are five towns (Khizerabad, Qadeemabad, central Hussainabad, Hussainabad Shabarn and Dolmani) situated at the left bank of the Hunza River. The village's population is approximately 3000 people.

References 

Hussainabad is considered as most educated region in Hunza where every household has at-least one master's degree holder. Geographically Hussainabad is situated to left side of the river and is mostly affected by natural calamities. Seko, Also called Qadeemabad is located at the bottom of a Mountain called Gakos which disturbs the life of people when sliding occurs. Thousands of people have been living in shelters at a safe place nearby called Central hussainabad. Khizarabad is also targeted by landslide many times. Yet the people are looking for Government's concentration towards this targeted region. Improper roads and connecting bridge are also issues faced by people of Hussainabad. Recently RCC bridge has been constructed after being delayed many times in the intervals of different governments. The delays resulted in more than a decade to construct the bridge. After every natural disaster people become disconnected from rest of the region, taking their own initiatives to reinstall the road and water channels. The area has faced scarcity of water to irrigate lands for six months in 2010 which led people to bear reasonable losses from their agricultural production.

Hunza